Glenea splendidula is a species of beetle in the family Cerambycidae. It was described by Karl-Ernst Hüdepohl in 1996. It is known from the Philippines.

References

splendidula
Beetles described in 1996